Akinmayokun Awodumila (born 28 December 1984), popularly known as May D, is a Nigerian singer. He was formally signed to R&B duo P-Square's record label Square Records.

Biography 

May D was born Akinmayokun Awodumila in Lagos into a family of seven. He attended the University of Lagos, where he studied mass communication.

He rose to stardom in the same year he got signed to the label Square Records, 2011. On 21 August 2012, it was officially announced that May D is no longer in the label, as stated by Premium Times news.

On 13 May 2011, May D released his first single "Soundtrack" via the label Square Records. The music video, directed by Clarence Peters, was released on 12 January 2012. The video originally had over 10 million views on their YouTube channel before being deleted by the label. On 25 September 2012, May D founded an independent record label known as Confam Entertainment. On 18 July 2020, May D announced on his Twitter handle that he has signed with Davido Music Worldwide.

Discography

Studio albums and EPs 
 Chapter One(2013)
 Sureboy (2021)

As lead artist

As featured artist

Awards and nominations

References 

Yoruba-language singers
21st-century Nigerian male singers
Living people
Musicians from Lagos
University of Lagos alumni
1984 births